Ko Chang-Hyun (born September 15, 1983) is a South Korean football player who lastly played for Ulsan Hyundai FC.

Club career statistics 
As of April 18, 2011.

Honors
Ulsan Hyundai
 AFC Champions League (1): 2012

References

External links

1983 births
Living people
Association football midfielders
South Korean footballers
Suwon Samsung Bluewings players
Busan IPark players
Gimcheon Sangmu FC players
Daejeon Hana Citizen FC players
Ulsan Hyundai FC players
K League 1 players